The Gaya–Kiul line is a railway line connecting Gaya on the Howrah–Gaya–Delhi line and Kiul on the Howrah–Delhi main line both in the Indian state of Bihar.

History
Several years before the Grand Chord was built, a connection from the Howrah–Delhi main line to Gaya was developed in 1900 and the South Bihar Railway Company (operated by EIR) had laid a line from Lakhisarai to Gaya in 1879. The Grand Chord was opened on 6 December 1906.

Rail Track Doubling

To cater to the growing freight traffic, Cabinet Committee on Economic Affairs today approved the doubling of 124 km long Kiul-Gaya railway line estimated to cost Rs 1354.22 crore in March 2016. Chaired by Prime Minister Narendra Modi, the CCEA decided in favour of doubling of this line which will ease the ever increasing freight traffic between the sections. 

The project is likely to benefit Lakhisarai, Sheikhpura, Nawadah and Gaya districts of Bihar and is expected to be completed by 2022-23. Doubling of this line will greatly ease the ever-increasing freight traffic between these sections. The project was likely to be completed by March 2022 but the project got delayed and new deadline is December 2023. However a part of project i.e. doubling of rail track between Manpur - Tilaiya is completed in September 2022 and operational.

Other phases are scheduled to be completed as follows:-

East Central Railway has completed rail track doubling of the 42 km of Manpur-Tilaiya Section of the 124-km Kiul-Gaya rail line. Rest of 82 km rail track doubling is expected to be completed by March 2024, if we project the work completed till date by the Railway. However, the phase 3 (Lakhisarai-Sheikhpura) section is expected to be commissioned by March 2023. It may be noticed that even after completion of rail track between Manpur-Tilaiya, no change in time table of train declared by the Railway authority. There is no benefit till date to passenger regarding time consumption while traveling to Kiul Gaya line.

Phase I: Manpur-Wazirganj  - December 2019 → Commissioned

Phase II: Wazirganj - Tilaiya — September 2022 → Commissioned 

Phase III: Lakhisarai-Sheikhpura — October 2022 (Track almost completed) may be commissioned by March 2023.

Phase IV: Sheikhpura - warisaliganj - March 2023

Phase V: Warisaliganj- Tilaiya — Dec 2023

Electrification and Doubling of track
Feasibility studies for the electrification of the Manpur–Tilaiya–Kiul section were announced in the rail budget for 2010–11 and the electrification work of singletrack is going on starting 2015–16. electrification of single line from Gaya to Kiul have been completed in July 2018. It has been completed in two phases. In first phase Tilaiya to Warisaliganj have been completed and in the other phase Warisaliganj to Lakhisarai. A special Memu train was flagged on 22 October 2018 by State Railway Minister Mr. Manoj Sinha. Track doubling is in progress and it is expected to be completed by December 2023.

Passenger movement
Gaya is the only station on this line that is amongst the top hundred booking stations of the Indian Railway. Apart from Gaya there are various local stations used by masses such as Nawada, Sheikhpura, Warisaliganj.

Since most of the trains ply between kiul and gaya the passenger movement is also limited. Since Kiul being a terminal station for most train does not have much significance as it is neither a great market place nor a tourist destination, neither it has great educational hub nor an industrial cluster, so it limits the no. Of passenger in this line. If more trains are run through this line to other cities like Deoghar, Asansol, Dhanbad, Ranchi, Varanasi, Delhi and other big cities this line would certainly provide more passenger boarding and deboarding.

The Distance between Kiul to Mughalsarai is 335 km via Patna and it is 334 km via Gaya. There are more than 30 trains from Kiul to Mughalsarai via Pa but only one train via Gaya that too a weekly with only 3AC accommodation. So the actual potential of passengers in this line is not reflected by no of trains running. on.

Railway reorganisation
In 1952, Eastern Railway, Northern Railway and North Eastern Railway were formed. Eastern Railway was formed with a portion of East Indian Railway Company, east of Mughalsarai and Bengal Nagpur Railway. Northern Railway was formed with a portion of East Indian Railway Company west of Mughalsarai, Jodhpur Railway, Bikaner Railway, and Eastern Punjab Railway. North Eastern Railway was formed with Oudh and Tirhut Railway, Assam Railway and a portion of Bombay, Baroda and Central India Railway. East Central Railway was created in 1996–97.

References

External links
Trains at Gaya India Rail Info
Trains at Kiul India Rail Info

|

5 ft 6 in gauge railways in India
Railway lines in Bihar

Transport in Gaya, India

1879 establishments in India
Railway lines opened in 1879